Electra One (also known as With Death on Your Back) is a 1967 Spanish-Italian-French Eurospy film directed by Alfonso Balcázar and starring  George Martin. It was originally shot in an experimental 70mm 3D filming technique.

Cast  
  George Martin as Gary
 Vivi Bach as Monica
 Klausjürgen Wussow as Klaus
 Daniele Vargas as  Electra 1
 Rosalba Neri as  Silvana
  Michael Montfort as Bill
 Ignazio Leone as  Ivan
 Georges Chamarat as Prof. Roland
  Maria Badmayew as  Madame Van Hallen

References

External links

1960s spy thriller films
Spanish spy thriller films
Italian spy thriller films
West German films
Films directed by Alfonso Balcázar
Films set in Hamburg
Films set in West Germany
1960s 3D films
Spanish 3D films
Italian 3D films
French 3D films
German 3D films
Films scored by Claude Bolling
1960s Italian films
1960s Spanish films